Muchamad Wildan Ramdhani Nugraha (born 24 December 1998) is an Indonesian professional footballer who plays as a forward for Liga 1 club Persita Tangerang.

Club career

Persib Bandung
Wildan started his career as a footballer by joined Persib Academy. In 2018, Wildan was promoted to join the senior team with his academy teammate, Beckham Putra. However, his fate was different from his colleagues, when Beckham started to get the main place in Persib, Wildan had difficulty getting minutes to play in the team. And Finally, he made his professional debut in the Liga 1 on 10 August 2018, against Mitra Kukar where he played as a substitute. After being loaned to Bandung United in 2019, that also failed to improve his performance. As a result, Wildan chose to leave in 2022.

Bandung United (loan)
He was signed for Bandung United to play in the Liga 2 in the 2019 season, on loan from Persib Bandung. He made 23 league appearances and scored 6 goals for Bandung United.

Persita Tengerang
Wildan was signed for Persita Tangerang to play in Liga 1 in the 2022–23 season. He made his league debut on 25 July 2022 in a match against Persik Kediri and also scored his first league goal for the team, he scored in the 56th minute at the Indomilk Arena, Tangerang. He scored his second league goal for the club on 19 August, opening the scoring in a 5–3 win against Persikabo 1973. On 28 August, he scored a brace for Persita in a 2–3 win against Bhayangkara at Wibawa Mukti Stadium. On 29 September, Wildan scored equalizer in a 1–2 away win over PSS Sleman, he was also selected as man of the match in that match. On 13 December, Wildan was involved in Persita's big 4–1 win over RANS Nusantara, scoring in the 32nd minute.

On 15 February 2023, Wildan scored in 74th minute and saved Persita Tangerang from losing to Madura United , score draw 1–1.

References

External links
 
 Wildan Ramdhani at Liga Indonesia

Indonesian footballers
Living people
1998 births
Sportspeople from Bandung
Sportspeople from West Java
Persib Bandung players
Bandung United F.C. players
Persita Tangerang players
Liga 1 (Indonesia) players
Association football forwards